Tom Kirk (born 6 August 1992) is a professional cricketer who plays for Guernsey. He played in the 2016 ICC World Cricket League Division Five tournament.

References

External links
 

1992 births
Living people
Guernsey cricketers
Place of birth missing (living people)